The Ajai Wildlife Reserve is a small conservation protected area in northeastern Uganda dominated by a large island surrounded by seasonally flooded swamps and wooded savanna.

Location

History
Before Ajai was gazetted as a wildlife reserve in 1965, the Ajai Rhino Sanctuary was home to 60 of Uganda's 80 remaining white rhino. The WWF funded an anti-poaching project there in 1962.

In 2002  were carved out of the reserve to make space for human settlements. 

In 2008 the Uganda Wildlife Authority privatized the operation of Ajai. The concession went to Uganda Wildlife Safaris Ltd, a hunting and photographic tour operator.

Wildlife 
The reserve supports around 35 kilometers of papyrus swamp along with grassy floodplains and Savannah woodland. Large mammals present include leopard, Uganda Kob, sitatunga, hippo, black-and-white colobus and warthog, and there are reputedly long-term plans to introduce southern white rhinos.

Getting there 
To get to Ajai from Arua, follow the surfaced Packwach Road south for 15 kilometers to Olevu, then branch left on to a 40 kilometer dirt road running east to the reserve.

References

Important Bird Areas of Uganda